Lawrence Allen Swoope II, mononymously-known as Swoope, (born April 2, 1986) is an American hip hop Christian singer-songwriter and producer born and raised in Akron, Ohio. He was a member of the rap collective W.L.A.K. and High Society with Sho Baraka.

Background
Swoope was born Lawrence Allen Swoope II on April 2, 1986 in Akron, Ohio.  His mother, Diana Lynn Swoope (née, Cook), is the Pastor for Arlington Church of God, also in Akron. His father is Lawrence Allen Swoope I.

History
His career started off in 2010 with the release of the EP Applause Vol. 1 and the single "Actions Speak Louder". On April 24, 2011, Swoope released an EP entitled Spring Fling. On June 15, 2011, he released Spring Fling Instrumentals. On February 8, 2012, Swoope released the EP Boys R Us. His debut studio album, entitled "Wake Up," was released on March 20, 2012 with Collision Records. His Sinema album was released on August 5, 2014, also with Collision Records. He also independently released two mixtapes, "The Zoo" and "A.I.R.: The Abstract Intellect Revolution" After the release of Sinema, Swoope followed up with a free EP on October 10, 2014 called "Because You Asked." On February 5, 2016 it was announced that Swoope had left Collision Records. He then independently released Sonshine on February 2, 2018. The album went through three iterations where Swoope dealt with depression and his thoughts as a black man in America before finding new meaning and hope in his faith.

Swoope's song "Beauty and the Beast" was made the iTunes Single of the Week for the week of August 5, 2014.

Discography

Studio albums

References

External links
 

1986 births
Living people
African-American rappers
African-American Christians
American evangelicals
American performers of Christian hip hop music
Musicians from Akron, Ohio
Rappers from Ohio
21st-century American rappers
21st-century African-American musicians
20th-century African-American people